The Secret of the Magic Gourd may refer to:

The Secret of the Magic Gourd (novel), novel by Chinese author Zhang Tianyi
The Secret of the Magic Gourd (1963 film), 1963 Chinese film adapted from the novel
The Secret of the Magic Gourd (2007 film), 2007 live-action movie made by Centro in co-operation with China Movie Co Ltd and Disney